This article lists notable people associated with Stuyvesant High School in New York City, New York, organized into rough professional areas and listed in order by their graduating class.

Significant awards
The lists below include alumni who have won significant awards in their fields of endeavor.  Some of these are:

Joseph L. Mankiewicz (1924) – 1949, 1950 Academy Award for Best Director for A Letter to Three Wives and All About Eve
Joshua Lederberg (1941) – 1958 Nobel Prize in Physiology or Medicine
Peter Lax (1943) – 1987 Wolf Prize in Mathematics, 2005 Abel Prize 
Robert Fogel (1944) – 1993 Nobel Memorial Prize in Economic Sciences
Elias Stein (1949) – 1999 Wolf Prize in Mathematics
Paul Cohen (1950) – 1966 Fields Medal
Roald Hoffmann (1954) – 1981 Nobel Prize in Chemistry
Richard Axel (1963) – 2004 Nobel Prize in Physiology or Medicine
Tim Robbins (1976) – 2003 Academy Award for Best Supporting Actor for Mystic River
Eric S. Lander (1974) - 2013 Breakthrough Prize in Life Sciences

Mathematics
Peter Lax (1943) – fluid dynamics, differential equations; elected 1970 to the United States National Academy of Sciences, 1987 Wolf Prize, 1992 Steele Prize, 2005 Abel Prize (New York University, emeritus)
Bertram Kostant (1945) – lie groups and representation theory; elected in 1978 to the United States National Academy of Sciences (Massachusetts Institute of Technology)
D. J. Newman (1947) – analytic number theory, long-time editor of problems section in the American Mathematical Monthly (Temple University, emeritus)
Harold Widom (1949) – integral equations, symplectic geometry (University of California, Santa Cruz), 2007 Wiener Prize
Elias Stein (1949) – harmonic analysis; 1974 elected to United States National Academy of Sciences, 1993 Schock Prize, 1999 Wolf Prize, 2002 Steele Prize (Princeton University)
Paul Cohen (1950) – logic, Banach algebras, 1964 Bôcher Prize, 1966 Fields Medal, elected 1967 to the United States National Academy of Sciences (Stanford University)
Neil R. Grabois (1953) – commutative algebra (President, Colgate University)
Jeff Rubens (1957) – probability and statistics, co-editor of The Bridge World (Pace University)
Melvin Hochster (1960) – commutative algebra, algebraic geometry, invariant theory; 1980 Cole Prize, elected in 1992 to the United States National Academy of Sciences (University of Michigan)
James Lepowsky (1961) – lie theory (Rutgers University)
Peter Shalen (1962) – low-dimensional topology, Kleinian groups, hyperbolic geometry (University of Illinois at Chicago)
Robert Zimmer (1964) – ergodic theory, dynamical cocycles (President of University of Chicago)
Richard Arratia (1968) – probability, combinatorics (USC)
David Harbater (1970) – algebraic geometry; NSF Postdoctoral Fellow, in 1994 Invited Lecturer to the International Congress of Mathematicians, 1995 Cole Prize (University of Pennsylvania)
Paul Zeitz (1975) – ergodic theory (University of California, San Francisco)
Jon Lee (1977) – mathematical optimization (G. Lawton and Louise G. Johnson Professor of Engineering, University of Michigan)
Noam Elkies (1982) – elliptic curves; youngest person ever to win tenure at Harvard; his musical compositions have been performed by major symphony orchestras (Harvard University)
Dana Randall (1984) – discrete mathematics, theoretical computer science (Georgia Tech)
Elizabeth Wilmer (1987) – Markov chains (Oberlin College)
Michael Hutchings (1989) – topology, geometry (University of California, Berkeley)
Aleksandr Khazanov (1995) – Math Olympiad; Curry Fellowship; skipped college and became a PhD student at Pennsylvania State University
Michael Develin (1996) – combinatorics, geometry; American Institute of Mathematics Fellow (University of California, Berkeley)

Physics
Marshall Rosenbluth (1942) – theory of liquids, fusion; Fermi Award, United States National Academy of Sciences (University of California, San Diego, emeritus)
Rolf Landauer (1943) – physics of computation; elected in 1988 to the United States National Academy of Sciences, IBM Fellow (Thomas J. Watson Research Center) (d. 1998)
Paul Chaikin (c. 1962) - condensed matter physics, elected to both the American Academy of Arts and Sciences (2003) and National Academy of Sciences (2004), Oliver Buckley Prize (2018), (New York University)
Brian Greene (1980) – string theory, mirror symmetry, author of The Elegant Universe; Rhodes Scholar (Columbia University)
Lisa Randall (1980) – high energy physics, Randall–Sundrum model, 2004 elected to the American Academy of Arts and Sciences (Harvard University)

Chemistry
Sheldon Datz (c. 1943) – 2000 Fermi Award
Benjamin Widom (1945) – phase transitions, stat. mechanics, elected in 1974 to the United States National Academy of Sciences (Cornell University)
Andrew Streitwieser, Jr. (1945) – organic chemistry, textbook author; elected in 1969 to the United States National Academy of Sciences, Sloan Fellow, Guggenheim Fellow (University of California, Berkeley)
Edward Kosower (1945) – biophysics, 1996 Rothschild Prize in Chemistry (Tel Aviv University)
Roald Hoffmann (1955) – geometric structure and reactivity of molecules, elected in 1972 to the United States National Academy of Sciences, 1973 Cope Award, 1981 Nobel Prize in Chemistry (Cornell University)

Life sciences and medicine
Paul S. Appelbaum (1968) – psychiatrist and a leading expert on legal and ethical issues in medicine and psychiatry
Hyman Biegeleisen (c. 1922) – physician and vein expert, pioneer of phlebology
Philip H. Sechzer (1930) – anesthesiologist, pioneer in pain management; inventor of patient-controlled analgesia
Joshua Lederberg (1940) – genetics; 1957 United States National Academy of Sciences, 1958 Nobel Prize in Physiology or Medicine, 1989 National Medal of Science, former President of Rockefeller University, 2006 Presidential Medal of Freedom
Alvin Poussaint (1952) – clinical psychiatry (Judge Baker Children's Center, Harvard University)
Robert Ira Lewy (1960) – hematology, Baylor College of Medicine; developed early application of aspirin in heart disease; donated to the creation of the Stuyvesant High School library in 2006, the Dr Robert Ira Lewy Multimedia Center
Richard Axel (1963) – biochemistry, 2004 Nobel Prize
Robert Lustig (c. 1972) – pediatric endocrinologist, professor at the University of California, San Francisco
Eric Lander (1974) – computational biology; Westinghouse scholarship, Rhodes Scholar, MacArthur Fellow, co-director of Human Genome Project, 1997 United States National Academy of Sciences (Massachusetts Institute of Technology)
Uché Blackstock (1995) – emergency physician and equity advocate
Oni Blackstock (1995) – primary care and HIV physician and researcher

Social sciences

 Lewis Mumford (1912) – historian of technology and science
 Igor Ansoff (1937) – business theorist, coined term "strategic management"
 Robert Fogel (1944) – economist, winner of 1993 Nobel Memorial Prize in economics
 Samuel P. Huntington (c. 1945) – political theorist, author
 Bruce Bueno De Mesquita (c. 1963) – political scientist and professor at New York University
 Thomas Sowell (1947) – economist
 Edward Von der Porten (1951) – early nautical archaeologist, expert in early Chinese export porcelains
 Gerald M. Pomper (c. 1951)  – expert on American politics and elections at Rutgers University
 John F. Banzhaf III (c. 1955) – professor and practitioner of public interest law at George Washington University
 Michael Levin (1960) – philosopher, author of Why Race Matters

Technology
Hans Mark (1947) – aerospace engineering; served as Deputy Administrator of NASA, and Secretary of the United States Air Force
Ronald J. Grabe (1962) – astronaut (NASA)
Richard Lary (1965)  – computer architecture; co-designer of VAX architecture (DEC)
Bob Frankston (1966) – software; author of the spreadsheet VisiCalc
Daniel Hirschberg (1967) – design of algorithms (University of California, Irvine)
Steven M. Bellovin (1968) – leading authority on firewalls and Internet security; elected to National Academy of Engineering in 2001 (Columbia University)
Omar Wasow (1988) – creator of BlackPlanet, Oprah's "tech guy", MSNBC Internet analyst
Naval Ravikant (1991) - Entrepreneur, Investor; Co-Founder and former CEO of AngelList
Bram Cohen (1993) – author of BitTorrent
Vishal Garg (1995) – Founder of Better.com

Writers

Staff
Frank McCourt – memorist and author; teacher of English and creative writing from 1972 until the late 1980s

Alumni
Samuel Spewack (c. 1917) – screenwriter, playwright, and double Tony Award-winner for Kiss Me, Kate and Academy Award nominee for My Favorite Wife
Louis Zukofsky (c. 1918-1920) - poet
Henry Roth (c. 1920). Author of Call It Sleep.
Nick Meglin (1953) – longtime MAD Magazine editor, and playwright
Andrew Kaplan (1958) writer, author of Hour of the Assassins, Scorpion, Dragonfire, War of the Raven
Marv Goldberg (1960) music critic and writer
Alexander Rosenberg (1963) – novelist and non-fiction writer
Eric Van Lustbader (1964) – writer, author of The Bourne Legacy and The Ninja
David Lehman (1966)  –  writer, editor, critic, and professor of creative writing; series editor of The Best American Poetry; author of numerous books of poetry and prose, including The Morning Line, Sinatra's Century, When a Woman Loves a Man, and Signs of the Times
M. G. Sheftall (1980) – writer, author of Blossoms in the Wind: Human Legacies of the Kamikaze
David Lipsky (1983) – novelist (Absolutely American)
Matt Ruff (1983) – writer (Set This House in Order)
Laurie Gwen Shapiro (1984) – author (The Stowaway) and documentary director
Jordan Sonnenblick (1987) – writer of young adult novels Drums, Girls, & Dangerous Pie, Notes from the Midnight Driver, Zen and the Art of Faking It, and Dodger and Me; student of Frank McCourt
Arthur M. Jolly (1987)' – Nicholl Fellowship in Screenwriting, playwright of Past Curfew and A Gulag Mouse; student of Frank McCourt
Alissa Quart (1989) – critic, journalist, poet, and editor; author of Republic of Outsiders: The Power of Amateurs, Dreamers and Rebels, Hothouse Kids: The Dilemma of the Gifted Child, Branded: The Buying and Selling of Teenagers, and Monetized
Gary Shteyngart (1991) – author of The Russian Debutante's Handbook and Absurdistan
Rebecca Pawel (1995) – writer
Daniel Genis (1996) – writer, journalist, and ex-convict; columnist at Vice; author of The Last Beat: 1046 Books Behind the Wall
Jessica Valenti (1996) – writer, online journalist, blogger, columnist and staff writer at The Guardian
Ned Vizzini (1999) – writer

Music
Kai Winding (1935) – jazz trombonist and composer
Thelonious Monk (1936) – jazz pianist and composer
Julius Hegyi (1941) – conductor and violinist
Tom Dowd (1942)  – pioneer recording engineer, 1992 Grammy Award
Bobby Colomby (1962) – drummer and record producer
Walter Becker (1967) – co-founder of Steely Dan
 Richard Lloyd (1969)  – guitarist for punk band Television and Matthew Sweet
Kate Schellenbach (1983) – musician with the Beastie Boys and Luscious Jackson
Asher Lack (2001) – front-man, principal songwriter and founder of the band Ravens & Chimes
Rebecca Jean Rossi (2003) – piano, vocals with Ravens & Chimes
Heems (2003) – rapper, member of Das Racist and Swet Shop Boys
Alex Weiser (2006) – composer, finalist for the 2020 Pulitzer Prize for Music

Film
James Cagney (1918) – actor and dancer
J. Edward Bromberg (c. 1920) – actor
Joseph L. Mankiewicz (1924) – four-time Oscar-winning producer
Sheldon Leonard (1925) – Emmy-winning actor, producer, and director
William Greaves (1944) – Emmy-winning filmmaker
Ben Gazzara (1946) – Emmy Award-winning actor
Simon Kornblit (1951) – former Executive Vice President of worldwide marketing for Universal Pictures; actor
Ron Silver (1963) – actor, director
Martin Brest (1969) – director, screenwriter, and producer
Paul Reiser (1973) – actor and producer
Tim Robbins (1976) – actor, screenwriter, director, producer; won Academy Award for Mystic River
Lucy Liu (1986) – actress
James Bohanek (1987) – Broadway and television actor
Heather Juergensen (1987) – actress and writer (Kissing Jessica Stein)
Louis Ozawa Changchien (1993) – actor
Billy Eichner (1996) – actor and comedian (Billy on the Street, Difficult People, Parks and Recreation)
Kelly Karbacz (1996) – actress (Rent, Sesame English, Regular Joe)
Malcolm Barrett (1998) – actor (Better off Ted, The Hurt Locker, Dear White People, and Timeless)
Telly Leung (1998) – Broadway and television actor
Emily Carmichael (2000) – director, screenwriter, and animator
Jeff Orlowski (2002) – Emmy-winning director and cinematographer (Chasing Ice)
Jonah Meyerson (2009) – actor (The Royal Tenenbaums, The Matador)

Journalism, radio, and television
Julius Edelman (1941), photojournalist – especially his jazz photos, known as Skippy Adelman
Jan Merlin (Wasylewski) (1942) – film, television, and Broadway actor; Emmy Award (1975)
Vladimir Posner (1948) – self-proclaimed independent journalist, author, Soviet propaganda and television personality. Hosts his own show on Channel One, a state-owned TV network in Russia 
Bernie Brillstein (1948) – producer and manager, Emmy winner
Barry Schweid (1949) – longtime politics and international affairs reporter for the Associated Press
Robert Siegel (1964) – radio journalist, All Things Considered
Len Berman (1964) – Emmy Award-winning NBC sportscaster
Sam Rosen (1965) – NFL announcer and play-by-play announcer for the NHL team, New York Rangers
Sam Marchiano (1985) – MLB.com sportcaster and host; daughter of longtime sports news anchor, Sal Marchiano
Mike Greenberg (1985) – ESPN sportscaster; co-host of the Mike and Mike show on ESPN Radio
Hanna Rosin (1987) – journalist
Jon Caramanica (1993) —pop music critic for The New York Times
Billy Eichner (1996) – Emmy-nominated host of Billy on the Street, actor
Harry Siegel (1996) – author, political consultant and journalist
Jessica Valenti (1996) – feminist blogger and writer
Reihan Salam (1997) – conservative writer at The Atlantic and Forbes.com, and blogger for The American Scene
Adriana Diaz (2002) – 2006 Miss New York USA
Ashok Kondabolu (2003) - co-creator and host of Chillin Island on HBO

Educators
Peter Sammartino (1921) – founder and first president of Fairleigh Dickinson University
Albert Shanker (1946) – served as President of the United and American Federations of Teachers; 1998 Presidential Medal of Freedom
John Tietjen (1946) – served as President of Concordia Seminary and Christ Seminary-Seminex

Business
Jack Nash (1946) – chairman of Oppenheimer & Company
Saul Katz (1956) – president of the New York Mets
Jeffrey Loria (1957) – former owner of Florida Marlins; former owner of Montreal Expos
Arthur Blank (1960) – founder of The Home Depot; owner of the Atlanta Falcons
Paul Levitz (1973) – president of DC Comics
Drew Nieporent (1973) – restaurateur
David Coleman (1987) – CEO of the College Board
Boaz Weinstein (1991) – hedge fund manager
Ronn Torossian (1992) – CEO of 5W Public relations
Amol Sarva (1994) – on founding team of Virgin Mobile; founder of Wireless Founders Coalition for Innovation; founder and CEO of Peek

Politics
Moe Fishman (1933) – co-founder and Executive Secretary/Treasurer of the Veterans of the Abraham Lincoln Brigade
George Silides (1938) - served in the Alaska Senate and was a businessman
Sy Schulman (ca. 1944) – civil engineer and urban planner, Mayor of White Plains, New York
Howard Golden (1945) – served as Brooklyn Borough President
Serphin Maltese (c. 1950) – longstanding New York State Senator
Roy Innis (1952) – served as national chairman of the Congress of Racial Equality; member of the National Rifle Association's governing board
Bob Moses (1952) – organizer of 1964 Freedom Summer; MacArthur Fellow
Bernard W. Nussbaum (1954) – law; served on the United States House Committee on the Judiciary during the Watergate impeachment inquiry, served as counsel to President Bill Clinton
Richard Ben-Veniste (1960) – law; assistant prosecutor on the Watergate Task Force, served on the 9/11 Commission
Harvey Pitt (1961) – Chairman of Securities and Exchange Commission
Ted Gold (1964) – political activist and Weathermen member
Dick Morris (1964) – political consultant
Jerry Nadler (1965) – U.S. Congressman
Eric Holder (1969) – United States Attorney General in President Barack Obama's administration
John Tsang Chun-wah (1969) – Financial Secretary of the Hong Kong Special Administrative Region
David Axelrod (c. 1972) – senior advisor to Barack Obama's campaign
Alan Jay Gerson (1975) – served on New York City Council
Dick Gottfried (????)  – New York State Assemblyman
Eva Moskowitz (1982) – served on New York City Council and founded the Success Academy Charter Schools
Dianne Morales (1985) – non-profit executive and political candidate
 Kathryn Garcia (1988) – Commissioner of the New York City Sanitation Department
Jessica Lappin (1993) – served on New York City Council
Grace Meng (1993) – U.S. Congresswoman

Sports
Herbert Vollmer (1914) – 1924 Olympic bronze medalist in water polo
Ray Arcel (1917) – member of International Boxing Hall of Fame
 Herbert Cohen (c. 1958) – Olympic fencer; coached the fencing team
Frank Hussey (1924) – sprinter; 1924 Olympic gold medalist
Albert Axelrod (1938) – 1960 Olympic bronze medalist in foil fencing
 Nat Militzok (ca. 1941) – NBA basketball player
 Harold Goldsmith – Olympic foil and épée fencer
Jack Molinas (1949) – former NBA player and key figure in the NCAA point shaving scandal
Charlie Scott (1966) – former NBA player and Olympic gold medalist in 1968
Robert Hess (2010) –  Chess Grandmaster
Nzingha Prescod (2010) – two-time Olympic foil fencer
Krystal Lara (2016) – Olympic swimmer

Other
Otto Soglow (1913-1915) – Reuben Award-winning New Yorker cartoonist and creator of The Little King comic strip; dropped out of Stuyvesant to support his family
George Kisevalter (c. 1925) – Central Intelligence Agency operations officer; handled Major Pyotr Popov, the first Soviet GRU agent run by the CIA, and Colonel Oleg Penkovsky
Morton Sobell (c. 1935) – convicted spy
Max Elitcher (c. 1935) – witness at the trial of Julius and Ethel Rosenberg
Charles Dryden (c. 1937) – member of the Tuskegee Airmen in World War II
George Segal (1941) – sculptor
Edwin Torres (c. 1949) – judge and author (Carlito's Way)
John Schoenherr (c. 1953) – mammologist and illustrator
Randolph Jackson (1960) – judge and author
Denny Chin (1971) – Judge on the U.S. Court of Appeals for the Second Circuit
Karin Immergut (1978) – United States district judge of the United States District Court for the District of Oregon
Victoria Kolakowski (1978) – judge on the Alameda County Superior Court; transgender activist
Rebecca Sealfon (2001) – winner of 1997 Scripps National Spelling Bee
Arvind Mahankali (2017) – winner of 2013 Scripps National Spelling Bee

References

External links
Stuyvesant High School Alumni Association
The Campaign for Stuyvesant's List of Notables
Stuyvesant HS official site

Stuyvesant High School
People
Manhattan-related lists